Inside Out is an EP by American heavy metal band Anthrax, released in 1998 via Ignition Records, following the release of their album Volume 8: The Threat Is Real.

Track listing

Japanese edition
"Inside Out" (John Bush, Scott Ian, Charlie Benante) – 5:35
"Snap / I'd Rather Be Sleeping (D.R.I. cover)" (Kurt Brecht, Spike Cassidy, John Menor, Eric Brecht) – 2:16
"Phantom Lord (Metallica cover)" (James Hetfield, Dave Mustaine, Lars Ulrich) – 4:30
"The Bends" (Radiohead cover) (Jonny Greenwood, Colin Greenwood, Ed O'Brien, Phil Selway, Thom Yorke) – 3:53

UK edition
"Inside Out" (Bush, Ian, Benante) – 5:33
"Giving the Horns" (Bush, Ian, Benante) – 3:35
"The Bends" (Greenwood, Greenwood, O'Brien, Selway, Yorke) – 3:52

Personnel
John Bush – lead vocals
Scott Ian – guitar, backing vocals
Frank Bello – bass, backing vocals
Charlie Benante – drums, additional guitar, percussion
Dimebag Darrell – lead guitar on "Inside Out"

Charts

References

1998 EPs
Anthrax (American band) EPs
Alternative metal EPs
Ignition Records albums